This is a list of British television related events from 1967.

Events

January
3 January – Children's stop-motion animation series Trumpton is the second programme on BBC1 to be shot in colour.
7 January – Debut of The Forsyte Saga, a blockbuster BBC dramatisation in 26 50-minute episodes originally shown on BBC2 and the first British television programme ever to be sold to the Soviet Union.
9 January – The long-running children's educational programme Look and Read debuts on BBC1.

February
3 February – David Frost confronts fraudster Emil Savundra on Rediffusion London's The Frost Programme.
28 February – National and regional newspapers carry advertisements from the Independent Television Authority requesting applicants for various new ITV contracts, one of which is Programme Contractor for Yorkshire Area (Contract D) – All Week. Ten formal bids are received by the closing date.

March
No events.

April
8 April – The United Kingdom wins the 12th Eurovision Song Contest in Vienna, Austria. The winning song is Puppet on a String performed by Sandie Shaw.

May
No events.

June
12 June – The 1967 franchise round sees a number of changes being made to the ITV regional map which will take effect from May to August 1968:
Any split weekday/weekend licences are removed in all regions, except London.
The London split is moved from Friday/Saturday to Friday at 7pm.
The North of England region is split into the North West and Yorkshire.
Granada, the existing weekday contractor for the North of England region, is given a seven-day licence for the new North West of England region.
Lord Thomson of Fleet is required to divest himself of most of his holding in Scottish Television.
A new company, Telefusion Yorkshire, later renamed Yorkshire Television, is given the licence to broadcast in the newly created Yorkshire region.
ATV wins the new seven-day Midlands licence, replacing ABC at the weekend.
ABC and Rediffusion, London are asked to form a joint company to take the London weekday franchise previously held by Rediffusion alone, the result, Thames Television, is 51% controlled by ABC.
The London Television Consortium, put together by David Frost wins the London weekend contract which now includes Friday evenings from 7pm. They go on air as London Weekend Television.
Most controversially, TWW loses its franchise for Wales and the West of England to Harlech Television which later becomes known as HTV on the arrival of UHF.
25 June – The Our World programme airs to over 30 countries featuring performers from the represented countries, the segment for the United Kingdom features The Beatles performing All You Need Is Love, with guests Mick Jagger, Marianne Faithfull, Keith Richards, Keith Moon, Eric Clapton, Pattie Harrison, Jane Asher, Graham Nash, Hunter Davies and others.

July
1 July – BBC2 becomes Europe's first colour TV broadcaster. The colour service is launched with live coverage from the Wimbledon Championships.
2 July – The BBC's colour Test Card F, featuring Carole Hersee, is broadcast for the first time.
3 July – News at Ten premieres on ITV. It airs nightly on weeknights until 1999 before being axed. It is then reintroduced in 2001, axed again in 2004 and brought back for a second time in 2008.

August
No events.

September
29 September
The Prisoner has its UK premiere on ATV and Grampian Television. The world premiere of the series occurs on 5 September when the series debuts on CTV in Canada.
Children's Supermarionation science-fiction series Captain Scarlet and the Mysterons debuts on ITV

October
13 October – Omnibus, an arts documentary series, begins.
 23 October – Service Information is broadcast by the BBC for the first time. The bulletins are broadcast three times each weekday on BBC2.

November
No events.

December
2 December – Colour television is officially launched on BBC2 which coincided with a new ident known as Cube 2. 
22 December – Dante's Inferno, Ken Russell's television film about Dante Gabriel Rossetti is shown in the Omnibus series.
25 December – The final edition of The Sooty Show is shown on the BBC after being cancelled by Paul Fox, the controller of BBC 1. Part of the reason for the cancellation is due to his decision to clear out long-running programmes on the channel to make way for new shows. The Sooty Show would return next year on ITV, being produced by the newly-launched London franchise Thames Television. 
26 December
The Beatles' Magical Mystery Tour airs on BBC1 in the UK.
Do Not Adjust Your Set premieres on ITV.

Debuts

BBC1
2 January – Sword of Honour (1967)
3 January – The Trumptonshire Trilogy: Trumpton (1967)
6 January – The Whitehall Worrier (1967)
7 January – The Forsyte Saga (1967)
15 January – Sir Arthur Conan Doyle (1967)
22 January – Great Expectations (1967)
24 February – The World of Wodehouse (1967)
4 April – Dee Time (1967–1969)
9 April – St. Ives (1967)
2 May – Further Adventures of Lucky Jim (1967)
8 May – Mickey Dunne (1967)
21 May – The Further Adventures of the Musketeers (1967)
26 May – Not in Front of the Children (1967–1970)
28 May – Champion House  (1967–1968)
12 June – Ask the Family (1967–1984)
20 June – Misleading Cases (1967–1971)
5 July – Rainbow City (1967)
1 August – Sorry I'm Single (1967)
4 August – Boy Meets Girl  (1967–1969)
18 August – Whistle Stop (1967–1968)
28 August – The Queen's Traitor (1967)
September – Batfink (1966–1967)
10 September – Pride and Prejudice (1967)
30 September – The Talk of the Town (1967–1974)
2 October – Belle and Sebastian (1967–1968) (Made in 1965)
3 October – A Series of Bird's (1967)
8 October – Ironside (1967–1975)
13 October – Omnibus (1967–2003)
22 October – Les Misérables (1967)
27 November – The Very Merry Widow (1967–1968)
26 December – Magical Mystery Tour (1967)
Unknown – The Rolf Harris Show (1967–1970; 1972–1974)

BBC2
9 January – Look and Read: Bob and Carol Look for Treasure (1967)
21 January – The Invaders (1967–1969)
30 January – Before the Fringe (1967)
4 February – Girl in a Black Bikini (1967)
18 March – The Paradise Makers (1967)
28 March – The Revenue Men (1967–1968)
27 April – Witch Hunt (1967)
3 June – This Way for Murder (1967)
12 June – Three of a Kind (1967)
22 July – Kenilworth (1967)
3 August – Face the Music (1967–1977: 1983–1984)
19 August – Angel Pavement (1967)
29 August – The Big M (1967)
16 September – The White Rabbit (1967)
28 October – Wuthering Heights (1967)
16 November – A Hundred Years of Humphrey Hastings (1967)
2 December – Vanity Fair (1967)
3 December – The World About Us (1967–1987)
10 December – The Charlie Drake Show (1967–1968)

ITV
2 January – Turn Out the Lights (1967)
6 January 
 Uncle Charles (1967)
 Mr. Aitch (1967)
11 February – Who Is Sylvia? (1967)
15 February – At Last the 1948 Show (1967–1968)
17 February – Mr. Rose (1967–1968)
18 February – Never Mind the Quality, Feel the Width (1967–1971)
24 February – My Man Joe (1967)
30 March – Seven Deadly Virtues (1967)
1 April – Vacant Lot (1967)
3 April – Market in Honey Lane (1967–1969)
18 April – The Golden Age (1967)
23 April – Spindoe (1967)
15 May – The Jetsons (1962–1963)
16 May – Half Hour Story (1967–1968)
19 May – The Fellows (1967)
27 May – Trapped (1967)
6 June – Hancock's (1967)
27 June – Sam and Janet (1967–1968)
29 June – Sanctuary (1967–1968)
1 July – The Golden Shot (1967–1975)
3 July – News at Ten (1967–1999, 2001–2004, 2008–present)
6 July 
 Danger Island (1967)
 Send Foster (1967)
8 July – Callan (1967–1972)
9 July – The Lion, the Witch and the Wardrobe (1967)
18 July – Escape (1967)
19 August – Haunted (1967–1968)
22 September – Baker's Half-Dozen (1967)
25 September 
 ITV Playhouse (1967–1982)
 Sexton Blake (1967–1971)
26 September – The Gamblers (1967–1968)
27 September 
 Man in a Suitcase (1967–1968)
The Flower of Gloster (1967)
28 September – Mystery Hall (1967)
29 September 
 Captain Scarlet and the Mysterons (1967–1968)
 Inheritance (1967)
 The Prisoner (1967–1968)
7 October – Sat'day While Sunday (1967)
8 October – Skippy the Bush Kangaroo (1967–1970)
29 October – The Pilgrim's Progress (1967)
14 November – No – That's Me Over Here! (1967–1970)
8 December – City '68 (1967–1968)
26 December – Do Not Adjust Your Set (1967–1969)
Unknown 
Tarzan (1966–1968)
Mission: Impossible (1966–1973)

Television shows

Changes of network affiliation

Continuing television shows

1920s
BBC Wimbledon (1927–1939, 1946–2019, 2021–2024)

1930s
The Boat Race (1938–1939, 1946–2019)
BBC Cricket (1939, 1946–1999, 2020–2024)

1940s
Come Dancing (1949–1998)

1950s
Andy Pandy (1950–1970, 2002–2005)
Watch with Mother (1952–1975) 
The Good Old Days (1953–1983)
Panorama (1953–present)
Take Your Pick! (1955–1968, 1992–1998)
Double Your Money (1955–1968)
Dixon of Dock Green (1955–1976)
Crackerjack (1955–1984, 2020–present)
Opportunity Knocks (1956–1978, 1987–1990)
This Week (1956–1978, 1986–1992)
Armchair Theatre (1956–1974)
What the Papers Say (1956–2008)
The Sky at Night (1957–present)
Blue Peter (1958–present)
Grandstand (1958–2007)

1960s
Coronation Street (1960–present)
The Avengers (1961–1969)
Songs of Praise (1961–present)
The Saint (1962–1969)
Z-Cars (1962–1978)
Animal Magic (1962–1983)
Doctor Who (1963–1989, 1996, 2005–present)
World in Action (1963–1998)
The Wednesday Play (1964–1970)
Top of the Pops (1964–2006)
Match of the Day (1964–present)
Crossroads (1964–1988, 2001–2003)
Play School (1964–1988)
Mr. and Mrs. (1965–1999)
The Newcomers (1965–1969)
Not Only... But Also (1965–1970)
World of Sport (1965–1985)
Call My Bluff (1965–2005)
Jackanory (1965–1996, 2006) 
Softly, Softly (1966–1969)
The Trumptonshire Trilogy (1966–1969)
All Gas and Gaiters (1966–1971)
It's a Knockout (1966–1982, 1999–2001)
The Money Programme (1966–2010)

Ending this year
 Sunday Night at the London Palladium (1955–1967)
 Emergency - Ward 10 (1957–1967)
 Hugh and I (1962–1967)
 The Illustrated Weekly Hudd (1966–1967)
 Batfink (1966–1967)

Births
 2 January – Ruth Gemmell, actress
 7 January – Mark Lamarr, British comedian/TV and radio presenter
 14 January – Emily Watson, English actress
 15 January – Paul J. Medford, actor
 21 January – Tony Hirst, actor
 16 February – Matthew Cottle, actor
 21 February – Neil Oliver, archaeologist, historian, author and broadcaster
 4 March – Tim Vine, actor and comedian, brother of Jeremy Vine 
 11 March – John Barrowman, Scottish-born actor
 21 March – Adrian Chiles, television presenter
 22 March – Joanne Malin, broadcaster and television presenter
 2 April – Helen Chamberlain, television presenter
 25 April – Tim Davie, BBC television executive
 26 April – Marianne Jean-Baptiste, actress
 4 May 
Anna Botting, journalist and newsreader
Kate Garraway, journalist and television presenter
 18 July – Paul Cornell, British television writer
 19 July – Rageh Omaar, broadcaster
 22 July – Rhys Ifans, Welsh actor
 26 July – Jason Statham, actor
 19 August – Lucy Briers, actress
 1 September – Steve Pemberton, English comedy writer and performer (The League of Gentlemen)
 18 September – Tara Fitzgerald, English actress
 21 September – Christopher Price, television presenter (died 2002)
 16 October – Davina McCall, British TV presenter and UK Big Brother host
 14 November – Letitia Dean, British actress
 15 November – Becky Anderson, journalist and newsreader
 Unknown – Miranda Sawyer, journalist and broadcaster

Death
 30 May – Claude Rains, actor, aged 77

See also
 1967 in British music
 1967 in British radio
 1967 in the United Kingdom
 List of British films of 1967

References